Fabiano Contarato (born 20 June 1966) is a Brazilian law professor, police chief, and politician affiliated to the Workers' Party. He was the most voted candidate for the Brazilian Senate in the state of Espírito Santo during the 2018 Brazilian general election, with over one million votes; it was the first time he ran for an elected office. Contarato is the first openly LGBT person to be elected for the Brazilian Senate. His win unseated Magno Malta, a conservative evangelical pastor and close ally of far-right Brazilian President Jair Bolsonaro. In 2023, he was nominated as Head of the Worker's Party group in the Senate.

References

1966 births
Gay politicians
Gay police officers
Brazilian LGBT politicians
Brazilian LGBT rights activists
Living people
People from Nova Venécia
Workers' Party (Brazil) politicians
LGBT legislators